The Arboretum du Rosay (2.5 hectares) is a new arboretum within the parc du domaine de Rosay in Sablé-sur-Sarthe, Sarthe, Pays de la Loire, France. The park was named a historical monument in 1992, has been owned by the municipality since the late 1990s, and in 2007-2008 was planted with 120 trees by school children and adults. Plantings include conifers, deciduous trees, ginkgo, and palm trees, each labeled with botanical name.

See also 
 List of botanical gardens in France

References 
 Les Cahiers de Sablé, no. 121 - August 2008 (French)
 Ouest-France, "À l'Arboretum du Rosay, 120 essences répertoriées - Sablé-sur-Sarthe", July 5, 2008 (French)
 Culture.gouv.fr: Liste des parcs et jardins protégés au titre des monuments historiques (French)

Rosay, Arboretum du
Rosay, Arboretum du